Super Blue is a 1978 album by jazz musician Freddie Hubbard.  It was originally released on the Columbia label and peaked at #6 on the Billboard Charts. The album features performances by Hubbard, Hubert Laws, Joe Henderson and Kenny Barron with George Benson guesting on one track. In 2007 the album was rereleased on the Mosaic Contemporary label with three alternate takes.

Track listing
"Super Blue" (Benard Ighner) - 7:50
"To Her Ladyship" (Bill Frazier) - 6:01
"Take It To The Ozone" - 7:01
"The Gospel Truth" - 4:59
"The Surest Things Can Change" (Gino Vannelli) - 6:20
"Theme For Kareem" - 6:07
"Super Blue" [alternate take] (Ira Ingher) - 10:36 Bonus track on 2007 CD reissue
"Take It To The Ozone" [alternate take] - 6:56 Bonus track on 2007 CD reissue
"Theme For Kareem" [alternate take] - 6:44 Bonus track on 2007 CD reissue
All compositions by Freddie Hubbard except as indicated
 Recorded at CBS Recording Studios, New York, on March 30, 31 & April 1, 4, 1978 by Don Puluse, mixed at A&M Studios, Hollywood

Personnel
 Freddie Hubbard - trumpet and flugelhorn
 Hubert Laws - flutes
 Joe Henderson - tenor sax
 Ron Carter - bass
 Jack DeJohnette - drums
 Kenny Barron - keyboards
 George Benson - guitar (track 2)
 Dale Oehler - keyboards (track 1)

References

1978 albums
Columbia Records albums
Freddie Hubbard albums
Albums recorded at CBS 30th Street Studio
Albums recorded at A&M Studios